Antonio Šančić and Tristan-Samuel Weissborn were the defending champions but chose not to defend their title.

Bart Stevens and Tim van Rijthoven won the title after defeating Marek Gengel and Tomáš Macháč 6–7(2–7), 7–5, [10–3] in the final.

Seeds

Draw

References

External links
 Main draw

Open de Rennes - Doubles
2021 Doubles